Grobbelaar is a common Afrikaans surname, derived from the German Grobler. It may refer to:

Bruce Grobbelaar (born 1957), Zimbabwean football player
Madelaine Grobbelaar Petsch (born 1994), American actress
General Pieter Grobbelaar (1908–1988), South African military commander

Afrikaans-language surnames
Surnames of German origin